Grand-Lac-Salé Ecological Reserve is an ecological reserve of Quebec, Canada. It was established on January 24, 1996. It is located on the south shore of Anticosti Island.

References

External links
 Official website from Government of Québec

Protected areas of Côte-Nord
Nature reserves in Quebec
Protected areas established in 1996
1996 establishments in Quebec
Anticosti Island